Alexander's Ragtime Band is a 1938 musical film released by 20th Century Fox that takes its name from the 1911 Irving Berlin song "Alexander's Ragtime Band" to tell a story of a society boy who scandalizes his family by pursuing a career in ragtime instead of "serious" music. The film generally traces the history of jazz music from the popularization of Ragtime in the early years of the 20th century to the acceptance of swing as an art form in the late 1930s using music composed by Berlin. The story spans more than two decades from the 1911 release of its name-sake song to some point in time after the 1933 release of "Heat Wave", presumably 1938. 

It stars Tyrone Power, Alice Faye, Don Ameche, Ethel Merman, Jack Haley and Jean Hersholt. Several actual events in the history of jazz are fictionalized and adapted to the story including the tour of Europe by Original Dixieland Jass Band, the global spread of jazz by U.S. soldiers during World War I, and the 1938 Carnegie Hall performance by The Benny Goodman Orchestra.

The story was written by Berlin himself, with Kathryn Scola, Richard Sherman (1905–1962) and Lamar Trotti. In 1944, a federal judge ruled that most of the story by Berlin and collaborating writers had been plagiarized from a 1937 manuscript by author Marie Dieckhaus, but that decision was reversed on appeal.

Alexander's Ragtime Band was 20th Century Fox's highest-grossing film of the 1930s and was nominated for six Academy Awards, winning the award for Best Music, Scoring.

Cast

 Tyrone Power as Alexander
 Alice Faye as Stella Kirby
 Don Ameche as Charlie Dwyer
 Ethel Merman as Jerry Allen
 Jack Haley as Davey Lane
 Jean Hersholt as Professor Heinrich
 Helen Westley as Aunt Sophie
 John Carradine as Taxi Driver
 Paul Hurst as Bill
 Douglas Fowley as Snapper
 Chick Chandler as Louie
 Eddie Collins as Corporal Collins
 Joseph Crehan as Stage Manager
 Wally Vernon as Himself
 Ruth Terry as Ruby
 Robert Gleckler as Eddie
 Charles Coleman as Head Waiter
 Stanley Andrews as Colonel
 Selmer Jackson as Radio Station Manager
 Charles Williams as Agent
 Carol Adams as Hat Check Girl
 Tyler Brooke as Assistant Stage Manager
 Lon Chaney Jr. as Photographer on Stage
 Ken Darby as Army Quartet Member
 Ralph Dunn as Army Captain
 James Flavin as Army Captain
 Harold Goodwin as Military Policeman at Army Show
 Rondo Hatton as Barfly
 Edward Keane as Army Major
 King's Men as Singing Army Quartet - Y.M.C.A.
 Robert Lowery as Reporter
 James C. Morton as Bartender at Scarbie's
 Frank O'Connor as Officer in Army Show Audience
 Edwin Stanley as Critic in Army Show Audience
 Charles Tannen as Dillingham's secretary

Songs
Alexander's Ragtime Band features several hit songs by Irving Berlin including "Heat Wave", "Some Sunny Day", "Blue Skies", "Easter Parade", "A Pretty Girl Is Like a Melody" and "Alexander's Ragtime Band". Previously released songs were re-arranged and used in conjunction with new songs written by Berlin for the film.

Reception

The film had its New York premiere at the Roxy Theatre on August 5, 1938, with Cuban bandleader Desi Arnaz heading the stage show.

Contemporary reviews from critics were positive. Frank S. Nugent of The New York Times wrote, "With those twenty-six Berlin tunes at its disposal and with such assured song-pluggers as Alice Faye and Ethel Merman to put them over, the picture simply runs roughshod over minor critical objection and demands recognition as the best musical show of the year." Variety wrote, "Superlative in conception, execution and showmanship, it provides a rare theatrical and emotional experience." Film Daily declared it "solid entertainment that should play to big returns." Harrison's Reports called it "Excellent entertainment, capably directed and acted." Russell Maloney of The New Yorker called the music "reason enough to see the film," though he criticized the "small, persistent, mosquitolike irritation of the plot" and instances of anachronistic dialogue.

At the time of its release, Alexander's Ragtime Band was 20th Century Fox's highest-grossing film ever with $2.63 million in domestic rentals and $3.6 million in worldwide rentals.

Plagiarism lawsuit
In 1937, composer Irving Berlin had been approached by 20th Century Fox to write a story treatment for an upcoming film entitled "Alexander's Ragtime Band." Berlin agreed to write a story outline for the film which would feature many of Berlin's signature tunes. Released on August 5, 1938, Alexander's Ragtime Band was a smash hit with audiences and grossed in excess of five million dollars. However, soon after, a plagiarism lawsuit was filed by author Marie Cooper Dieckhaus against Berlin and 20th Century Fox. In 1944, a federal judge ruled in Dieckhaus' favor that Berlin and collaborating writers had plagiarized a 1937 manuscript by Dieckhaus and used many of its elements. 

In 1937, Dieckhaus had submitted her manuscript to various Hollywood studio heads, literary agents, and other individuals for their perusal. The trial court ruled that much of her manuscript's plot was included in the film's screenplay. However, in 1946, this ruling was reversed on appeal because there was no evidence that Berlin and the others who worked on the film had ever seen Dieckhaus's manuscript.

Awards and honors

Alfred Newman won an Academy Award for Best Music, Scoring. The film was also nominated for:
 Best Picture
 Story – Irving Berlin
 Song – Irving Berlin for "Now It Can Be Told"
 Art Direction – Bernard Herzbrun and Boris Leven
 Film Editing – Barbara McLean

Radio adaptations
Alexander's Ragtime Band was presented as a one-hour radio adaptation on two occasions on Lux Radio Theatre. The first broadcast was on June 3, 1940. This adaptation starred Faye and Robert Preston. The second broadcast was on April 7, 1947, and starred Tyrone Power, Margaret Whiting, Al Jolson, Dick Haymes and Dinah Shore.
"A Birthday Tribute to Irving Berlin," an all-star celebration of Berlin's 50th birthday, broadcast on CBS on August 3, 1938 from New York, Hollywood, and Chicago, was coordinated with the premiere of the Fox film and concluded with a truncated dramatization of scenes from the film. Parts were read by Ethel Merman and Tyrone Power.

References

 Green, Stanley (1999) Hollywood Musicals Year by Year (2nd ed.), pub. Hal Leonard Corporation  pages 82–83

External links

 
 
 
 

1938 films
1938 musical comedy films
1938 romantic comedy films
1930s historical comedy films
1930s historical musical films
20th Century Fox films
American black-and-white films
American historical comedy films
American historical musical films
American historical romance films
American musical comedy films
American romantic comedy films
American romantic musical films
Films directed by Henry King
Films produced by Darryl F. Zanuck
Films scored by Alfred Newman
Films scored by Irving Berlin
Films set in London
Films set in New York City
Films set in Paris
Films set in San Francisco
Films set in the 1910s
Films set in the 1920s
Films set in the 1930s
Films that won the Best Original Score Academy Award
Films with screenplays by Kathryn Scola
Films with screenplays by Lamar Trotti
Jukebox musical films
Ragtime films
1930s English-language films
1930s American films